Bogomil Kostadinov Bozhurkin (born 2 September 2002) is a Bulgarian footballer who plays as an attacking midfielder for Bulgarian First League club Hebar Pazardzhik.

Career
Bozhurkin spent his youth years at the academy of Hebar Pazardzhik from 2015 to 2020. On 25 September 2018, he made his debut for the first team against Beroe Stara Zagora.

On November 3, 2022, he received his first call-up for the youth national team of Bulgaria.

References

External links

2002 births
Living people
Sportspeople from Bjelovar
Bulgarian footballers
Association football midfielders
FC Hebar Pazardzhik players
First Professional Football League (Bulgaria) players